Iraq competed at the 1988 Summer Olympics in Seoul, South Korea.

Competitors
The following is the list of number of competitors in the Games.

Results by event

Boxing
Men's Flyweight (– 51 kg) 
 Amir Hussain
 First Round — Lost to Gamal El-Komy (EGY), 1:4

Football (soccer) 
 Group Stage

 Team Roster:
 Ahmad Jassim
 Adnan Dirjal
 Hassan Kamal
 Ghanim Oraibi
 Samir Shaker
 Habib Jafar
 Younis Abd Ali
 Ahmad Radhi
 Ismail Mohammed
 Hussein Saeed
 Saad Qais
 Karim Salman
 Karim Allawi
 Basil Gorgis
 Natiq Hashim
 Mudhafar Jabbar
 Laith Hussein
 Radhi Shenaishil
 Salam Hasim
 Emad Hashim

 Head coach: Ammo Baba

References

Official Olympic Reports

Nations at the 1988 Summer Olympics
1988
1988 in Iraqi sport